The Maltese Third Division (also known as the BOV Third Division  due to sponsorship reasons) was the lowest league level in Maltese football until 2020 when it was merged with the Maltese Second Division to create the National Amateur League.

History 
The league was founded in 2000.

Until 2011 the division comprised two sections - Section A with eleven teams and Section B with eleven teams. Both sections play two rounds with the winner in each group getting promoted to the Maltese Second Division. Relegation play-offs between the 2nd and 3rd placed teams of both groups and the 10th-place finisher of Second Division determined the third team to be in the Second Division.

Because it is the lowest level in the Maltese Football League, there is no formal relegation from the league. However, the two lowest placed teams have to reapply to take part the following season.

For the 2007-08 season, Mtarfa F.C. replaced Ta' Xbiex after their league application was turned down, mainly due to their poor performances over a number of years. New teams can also apply to join the competition. Season 2009-10 saw Swieqi United F.C. joining, and they were followed by Marsascala F.C. in 2010-11.

On January 13, 2011, the Malta Football Association decided to reform the league to 14 teams as from season 2011–12, with the top 3 teams being promoted to the Second Division.

For season 2015–16, the matches were played at the Charles Abela Memorial Stadium in Mosta, Luxol St. Andrews ground in Pembroke and Sirens F.C. ground in San Pawl il-Baħar.

Clubs

Season-by-Season

References

External links 
 
 League at MaltaFootball.com

 
4
Fourth level football leagues in Europe